Paul Zammit (born 21 September 1969) is a Maltese manager and a former footballer, current manager of Sliema Wanderers. During his career he played as a forward.

Playing career
He played from 1990 to 2003, for Rabat Ajax, Hibernians, Ħamrun Spartans and Mosta.

Managerial career
At the end of 2003 he retired as a player and became coach of Mosta. In 2005, he moved to Valletta.

In 2008, he won the Maltese Coach of the Season award for coaching Valletta to victory in the Maltese Premier League. Valletta competed in the Champions League in July 2008 and were eliminated by Artmedia Petrzalka. Zammit's disciplined preparation for the two games meant the team were competitive.

In September 2008 he signed a two-year contract to continue coaching the club.

For the 2009–10 season Paul Zammit became the manager of Birkirkara. He managed to build up a squad with great teamwork and on 30 April 2010, his side beat Tarxien Rainbows and won the Maltese Premier League title with a game to play. At the end of the 2010–11 season, he was not offered a new contract by the Birkirkara committee. On 2 October 2011, Zammit was re-appointed as the club's head coach for the next two seasons.

On 23 January 2020 he was named head coach of Gżira United. After just a few months, he agreed with the club to leave the position on 29 May.

On 23 October 2021 Zammit has been confirmed as the new coach of Balzan F.C., signing a two-years contract. He parted ways with the club on 25 April 2022 by mutual agreement, after a poor run of form. On 9 June 2022, Zammit was appointed manager of Sliema Wanderers.

Honours

Valletta
Winner
 Premier League (2): 2007–08, 2015–16
 Super Cup (2): 2008, 2016

Birkirkara
Winner
 Premier League (2): 2009–10, 2012–13
 FA Trophy (1): 2014–15
 Super Cup (2): 2013, 2014

References

External links
 Paul Zammit at MaltaFootball.com

1969 births
Living people
Maltese footballers
Association football forwards
Rabat Ajax F.C. players
Mosta F.C. players
Maltese football managers
Mosta F.C. managers
Valletta F.C. managers
Gżira United F.C. managers
Maltese Premier League managers
Sliema Wanderers F.C. managers